Roger Jackson (born February 28, 1959)  is a former American football defensive back who played five seasons with the Denver Broncos of the National Football League. He played college football at Bethune-Cookman University and attended Central High School in Macon, Georgia. He was also a scout for nine years with the Minnesota Vikings, two with the Kansas City Chiefs and two with the Denver Broncos.

References

External links
Just Sports Stats

Living people
1959 births
Players of American football from Georgia (U.S. state)
American football defensive backs
African-American players of American football
Bethune–Cookman Wildcats football players
Denver Broncos players
Minnesota Vikings scouts
Kansas City Chiefs scouts
Denver Broncos scouts
Sportspeople from Macon, Georgia
21st-century African-American people
20th-century African-American sportspeople